In mathematics, a Newman–Shanks–Williams prime (NSW prime) is a prime number p which can be written in the form

NSW primes were first described by Morris Newman, Daniel Shanks and Hugh C. Williams in 1981 during the study of finite simple groups with square order.

The first few NSW primes are 7, 41, 239, 9369319, 63018038201, … , corresponding to the indices 3, 5, 7, 19, 29, … .

The sequence S alluded to in the formula can be described by the following recurrence relation:

The first few terms of the sequence are 1, 1, 3, 7, 17, 41, 99, … . Each term in this sequence is half the corresponding term in the sequence of companion Pell numbers.

Further reading

External links 
 The Prime Glossary: NSW number

Classes of prime numbers
Unsolved problems in mathematics